is a river in Japan.

Geography 
The Ayase River, takes its source in the city of Okegawa in Saitama Prefecture then joins the Naka River in Katsushika, Tokyo. The latter flows into the river Arakawa River,  before Tokyo Bay.

Development 

The course of the river was developed in Edo period (1603-1868), when Edo (old name of Tokyo) became the shogunal capital of Japan. Historically, the first part of the river is used for irrigation and agriculture, the middle and the end for the supply of water to the population of Tokyo and for river transport (the Ayase river notably allows the connection between the Arakawa and Tone).

The river caused several major floods.

Pollution

From the 1960s to the 1990s, the river was the most polluted in Japan, occupying twenty-five times the head of the classification of the most polluted rivers between 1972 and 2007. These pollutions are due to agriculture, to the density of the population living near the basin or the banks, and to industry. This situation led to the first depollution projects in the late 1990s and during the 2000s.

References 

Rivers of Saitama Prefecture
Rivers of Tokyo
Rivers of Japan